Prince Chinedu Munir Nwoko (born 21 December 1960) popularly known as Ned Nwoko is a Nigerian lawyer, philanthropist and politician. He was a member of the House of Representatives between 1999 and 2003 representing Aniocha/Oshimili Federal Constituency, Delta State. In January 2020, he undertook a symbolic expedition to Antarctica to flag off a Malaria Eradication Project. That made him the first black African to visit the South Pole (Antarctica).

Early life and education

Prince Chinedu (Ned) Munir Nwoko was born in December 21, 1957 into the Nwoko Royal Family, Idumuje Ugboko Kingdom in Aniocha North Local Government Area. He received primary and secondary education in Nigeria. He moved on to the United Kingdom, got his first degree in Law and History at the prestigious University of Keele, Staffordshire UK. He also attended King's College London, where he obtained an LLM in maritime and commercial law. Ned Nwoko was subsequently called to the English bar, at Lincoln's Inn. He was awarded Honourary Doctorate degree in Letters (D.Litt) by Commonwealth University College, Belize, North America.

Career

Nwoko began his legal career with a brief start at crown prosecution service and qualified as a solicitor of the supreme court of England and Wales. He worked at Kumars Solicitors and Pascaldiers & Co Solicitors before establishing Ned Nwoko & Co Solicitors in London.

Nwoko was secretary general, Nigerian legal practitioners UK, Member of the Law Society , England and Wales and was visiting adviser, citizens' advice bureau, based in London. At the peak of his legal sojourn in UK, he had the biggest black law firm in England and was recognized as the best black lawyer of African descent in England 1995.

Politics

Nwoko returned to Nigeria in December 1998 and made a remarkable entry into Nigeria's political scene when he was elected member of the House of Representatives between 1999 and 2003. He represented Aniocha / Oshimili federal constituency, making an impressive showing in the legislative house.

Ned Nwoko was instrumental to the initiation of the London and Paris Club Loans refund into Nigeria. He authored the reports that led to Nigeria government's discontinuation of monthly deductions from states’ allocations and commencement of refunds to States. Through his Law firm, Ned Nwoko Solicitors and his Company Linas International he investigated the multinational creditors and discovered discrepancies in loan repayments, and this resulted in the refund of the first tranches of loan beginning from the Obasanjo administration. He also charged the Federal government to court on behalf of 774 Local governments for the refund of illegal deductions and obtained judgment of $3.2billion for the local governments. The Federal government of Nigeria has refunded all the monies in line with the court judgment of 2013.]. Nigeria under the Buhari Administration was able to overcome her economic recession culminating in the payment of backlog of salaries of public service workers and development of infrastructure. A total of $20 billion has been refunded to States and Local Government because of his work. Nwoko also served on the Vision 2010 Committee and is a member of the capital market. He served as Chairman of the External Committee of Vision 2010. Nwoko is also the Chairman of Project Tourism Africa.

Malaria eradication advocacy
Ned Nwoko is a strong advocate of Malaria eradication in Africa. He is the initiator of the Ned Nwoko Malaria Eradication Project. He flagged off the Ned Nwoko Malaria Eradication campaign via a symbolic expedition to the Antarctica in January 2020. The Foundation is supporting the existing efforts of vaccine development by funding a research for the anti-malaria vaccine through a partnership with leading universities in Africa and other research establishments.

Visit to South Pole
In January 2020, Prince Ned Nwoko flagged off the malaria eradication campaign via a symbolic expedition to Antarctica. Ned Nwoko made history as the first black African to ever visit the South Pole, Antarctica. Ned leveraged on the global attention this expedition attracted to create awareness on the scourge of Malaria and how to permanently eradicate it in Africa. Ned and other adventurers arrived the Geographical South Pole, one of the two points where the earth’s axis of rotation intersects its surface. There he made history for Nigeria and Africa by mounting the Nigerian Flag making Nigeria the 13th country to hoist a flag there, announcing to the world that Africa is ready to solve the African problem, malaria. However, the Nigerian Government must take the necessary steps to ratify the Antarctic Treaty for the flag to remain there.

Mount Delta
Nwoko is the founder of the tourism destination Mount Delta, one of 21 tourism sites approved by Delta state government. The tourist site consists of museum, farm, zoo, fishponds, poultry and a 9-hole golf course.

Sports University
Nwoko is the founder of Sports University, located at Idumuje ugboko, the first sports University in sub Saharan Africa. The university which was granted operational license in 2022 by the federal government of Nigeria, through the National Universities Commission NUC, is offering courses in sports and other disciplines and would resume full academic activities soon.

Philanthropy
Through his foundation, Prince Ned Nwoko Foundation, he has contributed to the empowerment and education of youths of his constituency, senatorial district and state. In 2019, he donated $273,000 (N100M) for the rehabilitation of failed portions of the road linking the South Eastern Nigeria to the nation's capital, Abuja.

Personal life
Ned Nwoko has several wives and has children.

Awards and recognition
 2022: SOCIAL IMPACT PERSON OF THE YEAR – Leadership Newspaper
AWARD FOR MEDIA EXCELLENCE AND INNOVATION – Delta State University
ICON OF PHILANThROPHY AWARD – University of Nigeria, Nsukka
OUTSTANDING ACHIEVEMENT AWARD IN PHILANTHROPY - Champion newspaper
 2018:  Africa Value Awards - Effective Leadership and Youth Empowerment
 2019: Peace Achievers Awards
 2019:  Delta Role Model Awards - Humanitarian Services
 2019:  Prime Excellence Recognition Awards - Man of the year
 2019: Abuja AR Reporters Awards- Man of the year 2019
 2019:  Suncity Champions of Democracy Awards - Humanitarian Services
 2019: 5 stars awards for Tourism Development in Africa 
 2019: University of Nigeria, Nsukka Nigeria Philanthropy Awards
 2019:  Anti corruption crusader Awards
 2019:  All Africa Music Awards AFRIMMA - Africa Community Impact Awards

References

Living people
Alumni of Keele University
Alumni of King's College London
Members of the House of Representatives (Nigeria)
20th-century English lawyers
1960 births
21st-century Nigerian lawyers